Víctor Pérez (born 6 March 1953) is a Cuban weightlifter. He competed in the men's featherweight event at the 1980 Summer Olympics.

References

1953 births
Living people
Cuban male weightlifters
Olympic weightlifters of Cuba
Weightlifters at the 1980 Summer Olympics
Place of birth missing (living people)
Pan American Games medalists in weightlifting
Pan American Games gold medalists for Cuba
Weightlifters at the 1979 Pan American Games
20th-century Cuban people
21st-century Cuban people